Grady Cole Center is a small civic center located on the campus of Central Piedmont Community College in Charlotte, North Carolina. The 3,000 seat center is located near the city's center, and can host several types of events. It was built in 1954 to replace the Charlotte Armory Auditorium, which had been destroyed by fire. Originally the Charlotte Park Center, it was renamed in 1987 in honor of WBT Radio morning personality, Grady Cole. The arena is a part of the Mecklenburg County Sportsplex, which also includes the American Legion Memorial Stadium.

Noted events

TV Superman George Reeves and a troupe including Noel Neill, Gene Lebell, Chaz Chase, and The Florida Trio performed two shows at the center on August 31, 1957.

On September 25, 1960, Martin Luther King Jr. spoke at the Park Center after an invitation from the local NAACP chapter.  He had been invited to speak in Charlotte in 1958; however, he suffered a stabbing in New York that canceled his visit.

The building was an important venue for Jim Crockett Promotions during the organization's heyday. 

In the late 1980s and early 1990s, the Grady Cole center served as the practice facility for the Charlotte Hornets.

The arena hosted UFC 3 in 1994.

Concerts held in the arena include The Allman Brothers with Duane Allman, Frank Zappa, Black Sabbath, Bootsy Collins and James Gang in 1972, Pink Floyd in 1973, David Bowie in 1974, Cheap Trick in 1978, Ozzy Osbourne in 1991, as well as shows by Dire Straits, Rush, Frehley's Comet, Stevie Ray Vaughan , R.E.M., Warrant in the 1980s.

The venue hosted multiple Rave dance parties  with national and international touring DJs.

The arena hosted the 2007 CIAA women's volleyball tournament. The arena also hosted the Internet-only pay-per-view ROH The Big Bang! on April 3, 2010.

The arena was home to Barstool's Rough-N-Rowdy 3 in 2018.

Queens University of Charlotte has used the arena for athletic events in 2012 while construction work is done on their usual on-campus home.

External links
Venue Information

References

1954 establishments in North Carolina
Basketball venues in North Carolina
Indoor arenas in North Carolina
Jim Crockett Promotions
Sports venues completed in 1954
Sports venues in Charlotte, North Carolina
Basketball in Charlotte, North Carolina